Apisa manettii is a moth of the family Erebidae. It was described by Turati in 1924. It is found in Libya.

References

Moths described in 1924
Syntomini
Erebid moths of Africa